This is a list of African-American newspapers that have been published in Virginia.  It includes both current and historical newspapers.  

The first African-American newspaper in the state was The True Southerner, in 1865.  In the ensuing four decades, more than 50 such newspapers sprang up, addressing the manifold challenges facing the African American community during and after Reconstruction. Among these, a few took a leading role in the state's political discourse, such as the Richmond Planet, Virginia Lancet and Virginia Star.

Notable African-American newspapers in Virginia today include the New Journal and Guide, Roanoke Tribune, and Richmond Free Press.

Newspapers

See also 

List of African-American newspapers and media outlets
List of African-American newspapers in Kentucky
List of African-American newspapers in Maryland
List of African-American newspapers in North Carolina
List of African-American newspapers in Tennessee
List of African-American newspapers in Washington, D.C.
List of African-American newspapers in West Virginia
List of newspapers in Virginia

Works cited

References 

Newspapers
Virginia
African-American
African-American newspapers